The 198th New York State Legislature, consisting of the New York State Senate and the New York State Assembly, met from January 7, 2009, to December 31, 2010, during the later part of David Paterson's governorship, in Albany.

On June 8, 2009, began the 2009 New York State Senate leadership crisis.

State Senate

Senators
The asterisk (*) denotes members of the previous Legislature who continued in office as members of this Legislature. Roy J. McDonald changed from the Assembly to the Senate at the beginning of this legislature. Assemblyman Jose Peralta was elected to fill a vacancy in the Senate.

Note: For brevity, the chairmanships omit the words "...the Committee on (the)..."

Employees
 Secretary: ?

State Assembly

Assembly members
The asterisk (*) denotes members of the previous Legislature who continued in office as members of this Legislature.

Note: For brevity, the chairmanships omit the words "...the Committee on (the)..."

References

Sources
 Senate election results at NYS Board of elections
 Assembly election results at NYS Board of elections

192
2009 politics in New York (state)
2010 politics in New York (state)
2009 U.S. legislative sessions
2010 U.S. legislative sessions